The First World Scout Education Congress held in Hong Kong in 2013. In the event 500 participants from more than 100 countries participated  to discuss the future of education in scouting.  This is the 1st scout educational congress in the history of scouting. Over 1,000 people also took part in live video sessions via Internet and shared their ideas and questions in the comment section. The main areas of the congress was 21st century life skills, promoting diversity, youth empowerment and inter-connectivity.

Topics discussed at the Congress:

 Leadership
 Scouting's unity and identities
Values
Trends in youth and education
Youth empowerment
Competencies and skills for life
The Scout Method
Reaching out and diversity in scouting
Learning environments
Managing our adult resources

List of the World Scout Education Congress

See also 

 Bangladesh Scouts
 Scout Association of Hong Kong
 Asia-Pacific Scout Region (World Organization of the Scout Movement)
 World Organization of the Scout Movement
 23rd World Scout Jamboree

References 

Scouting events
Recurring events established in 2013
Quadrennial events